Seed Records has been the name of multiple record labels.

1970s American label 
Seed Records was a record label started in 1972 by Paul Clark, a musician involved in the Jesus music movement. The label ran until circa 1981, when he started Minstrel's Voyage Music. Seed Records was distributed by Word Records and ABC Records.

1990s American label 
Seed Records was a short-lived American independent record label owned by Atlantic Records. The label has released music by artists such as Tumbleweed, Madder Rose, Inch, Leatherface, The Nightblooms, Ivy, Television Personalities, The Pooh Sticks, The Earthmen, and The Pastels.

2000s British label 
A London based record label also named Seed Records was set up in 2000 by Rich Bevan and Joshu Doherty of electronica duo Posthuman. The original roster of artists who released music on Seed included Cursor Miner, Ardisson, Kansas City Prophets, The Doubtful Guest, Digitonal, and Posthuman.

Posthuman also promoted a series of events called 'Seed Showcases', including UnderLondonGround, held in the disused underground Aldwych tube station. Artists that played these events included the label's roster, alongside guests such as Aphex Twin, Alison Goldfrapp, Richard X, Plaid, Luke Vibert, T.Rauschmeire, Funkstörung, Mark Moore and many more.

There is no 13th release in the label catalogue.

The 14th release '1.21 Gigawatts' by MoQ was removed from the catalogue before physical release, and released instead as digital only SEEDEX04. It was later removed from sale entirely.

In 2006, for the label's official fifth birthday a series of limited edition CD releases sealed in bags with promotional items was released

Doherty left Seed in late 2006, turning over control to Bruce McClure, who had been involved with the label and live events for several years.

In 2011, Seed released Sleeps in Oysters second album, 'Lo!'. The first fifty editions came with animal masks and sewing kits. 
In 2012, Seed distributed the final album of the legendary Japanese games music producer Kazuki Sakata. 
In 2012, 'Hot Doctor' by The Dagger Brothers was released with remixes by Nightwave and Sleeps in Oysters. The special editions came with a 'Singalong a Dagger Brothers' song sheet. 
In 2013, The Dagger Brothers' album 'Bwananapple' was released as a limited-edition USB, with songs about Bruce Willis and a lyric sheet. It also included the 'Beast Tour 2009' rockumentary filmed at the Edinburgh Fringe in 2012 
In 2015, Seed put out a limited edition of one hundred 10" vinyl by Rutger Hauser and Eftus Spectun. This was a joint release with The Lumen Lake and Void of Ovals, and was the final release on the label.

Many of the Seed Records releases are highly limited in number and sought after by collectors. 
The main genres covered are electronica, techno, post-rock, and IDM.

An A-Z of artists who have released music with Seed Records:

Discography 

The following is a list of physical releases from Seed Records. A number of download-only releases were also made available from the label, some via password on the official site, others on their Bleep.com page.

References

Record labels established in 1972
Record labels disestablished in 1981
Electronic music record labels
British independent record labels